The Three Pure Ones, also translated as the Three Pure Pellucid Ones, the Three Pristine Ones, the Three Divine Teachers, the Three Clarities, or the Three Purities, are the three highest gods in the Taoist pantheon. They are regarded as pure manifestation of the Tao and the origin of all sentient beings.

The "Three" in Taoism
From the Taoist classic Tao Te Ching, it was held that "The Tao produced One; One produced Two; Two produced Three; Three produced All things." It is generally agreed by Taoist scholars that Tao produced One means Wuji produced Taiji, and One produced Two means Taiji produced Yin and Yang [or Liangyi in scholastic term]. However, the subject of how Two produced Three has remained a popular debate among Taoist Scholars. Most scholars believe that it refers to the Interaction between Yin and Yang, with the presence of Chi, or life force.

In religious Taoism, the theory of how Tao produces One, Two, and Three is also explained. In Tao produces One—Wuji produces Taiji, it represents the Great Tao, embodied by Hundun ("Heavenly King of the Chaotic Never-ending Primordial Beginning") at a time of pre-Creation when the Universe was still null and the cosmos was in disorder; manifesting into the first of the Taoist Trinity, Yuánshǐ Tiānzūn. Yuánshǐ Tiānzūn oversees the earliest phase of Creation of the Universe, and is henceforth known as Dàobǎo "Treasure of the Tao". In One produces Two—Taiji produces Yin Yang, Yuanshi Tianzun manifests into Lingbao Tianzun who separated the Yang from the Yin, the clear from the murky, and classified the elements into their rightful groups. Therefore, he is also known as Jīngbǎo "Treasure of the Law/Scripture". While Jīng in popular understanding means "scriptures", in this context it also mean "passing through" [the phase of Creation] and the Laws of Nature of how things are meant to be. In the final phase of Creation, Daode Tianzun is manifested from Língbăo Tiānzūn to bring civilization and preach the Law to all living beings. Therefore, He is also known as Shībǎo "Treasure of the Master".

Each of the Three Pure Ones represents both a deity and a heaven. Yuanshi Tianzun rules the first heaven, Yu-Qing, which is found in the Jade Mountain. The entrance to this heaven is named the Golden Door. "He is the source of all truth, as the sun is the source of all light". Lingbao Tianzun rules over the heaven of Shang-Qing. Daode Tianzun rules over the heaven of Tai-Qing. The Three Pure Ones are often depicted as throned elders.

Schools of Taoist thought developed around each of these deities. Taoist Alchemy was a large part of these schools, as each of the Three Pure Ones represented one of the three essential fields of the body: jing, qi and shen. The congregation of all three Pure Ones resulted in the return to Tao.

The first Pure One is universal or heavenly chi. The second Pure One is human plane chi, and the third Pure One is earth chi. Heavenly chi includes the chi or energy of all the planets, stars and constellations as well as the energy of God (the force of creation and universal love). Human plane chi is the energy that exists on the surface of our planet and sustains human life, and the earth force includes all of the forces inside the planet as well as the five elemental forces.

As the Three Pure Ones are manifestations of Primordial Celestial Energy, they are formless. But to illustrate their role in Creation, they are often portrayed as elderly deities robed in the three basic colours from which all colours originated: Red, Blue and Yellow (or Green) depending on personal interpretation of colour origins by additive or subtractive means. Each of them holds onto a divine object associated with their task. Yuánshǐ Tiānzūn is usually depicted holding the Pearl of Creation, signifying his role in creating the Universe from void and chaos. The Ruyi held by Lingbao Tianzun represents authority: the second phase of Creation where the Yang was separated from the Yin and the Law of Things was ordered in place. Lingbao Tianzun then took his seat on the left of Yuanshi Tianzun. Later, when all was complete, Daode Tianzun took his place on the right, with the fan symbolizing the completion of Creation, and the act of fanning representing the spreading of Tao to all Mankind.

Syncretic beliefs 
Some scholars believe depictions and theology of the Three Pure Ones from the Tang Dynasty and after were influenced by Church of the East conception about the Trinity because of the heavy Christian-Taoist contact and mutual influence of the time.

Yuanshi Tianzun

Yuanshi Tianzun ("Lord of Primordial Beginning") is also known as the "Jade Pure One" or "Honoured Lord of the Origin".

Lingbao Tianzun

Lingbao Tianzun ("Lord of the Numinous Treasure") is also known as the "Supreme Pure One" or "The Universally Honoured One of Divinities and Treasures".

In terms of worldview, the emergence of the Shàngqīng revelations signifies a major expansion of Taoism. Where the celestial masters had added the pure gods of the Tao to the popular pantheon, Shàngqīng enlarged this to include an entirely new layer of existence between the original, creative force of the Tao, represented by the deity "yuan shi tian wang" (heavenly king of primordial beginning), and created world as we know it. This celestial layer consisted of several different regions, located both in the far reaches of the world and in the stars, and imagined along the lines of the ancient paradises Penglai and Kunlun. It was populated by various divine figures: pure gods of the Tao who were emanations of original cosmic qi; immortals who had attained celestial status through effort and the proper elixir...

Lingbao Tianzun is associated with yin and yang and was responsible as the custodian of the sacred book. Lingbao Tianzun also calculates time and divides it into different epochs.

Daode Tianzun

Daode Tianzun ("Lord of the Way and its Virtue" or "Honoured Lord of the Tao and the Virtue"), also known as the "Grand Pure One" or the "Highest Elder Lord" (Taishang Laojun).

It is believed that Daode Tianzun manifested himself in the form of Laozi. Daode Tianzun is also the treasurer of spirits, known as the Lord of Man who is the founder of Taoism.  He is the most eminent, aged ruler, which is why he is the only Pure One depicted with pure white hair and beard.

There seem to have been a number of stages in the process of Laozi's eventual deification. First, the legendary figure began as a teacher and writer whose image eventually blended with that of the Yellow Emperor when Laozi came to be identified as a confidant of royalty. Traditional accounts, such as the life-story summarized earlier, transformed him into a cultural hero whose mother conceived him virginally. By the mid-second century C.E., Laozi had become the deity who delivered to Zhang Daoling the revelation of a new religious faith, giving rise to the Celestial Master's school. His image was still not complete. Next, perhaps also around the second or third century CE, Laozi seems to have been identified as a creator god who also enters the world to rescue humanity from tribulation. Laozi was now capable of incarnating himself, almost like Buddhist bodhisattvas. Not long thereafter he joined the triad of the Three Pure Ones, and finally Laozi emerged as the chief divine person. We have here one of the more interesting examples of apotheosis, or deification, in the history of religion.

According to Daozang, Daode Tianzun had manifested many various incarnations to teach living beings, and Laozi is one of his incarnations.

See also
 Ahuric triad
 Chinese folk religion
 Daode Tianzun
 Lingbao Tianzun
 Jade Emperor
 Quanzhen Taoism
 Trimurti
 Trinity
 Taoism
 Taoist Canon
 Yuanshi Tianzun
 Zhengyi Taoism

References

Citations

Sources

External links
 

Deities in Taoism
Chinese gods
Taoist cosmology
Triple gods